Eucharis × grandiflora is a natural hybrid of flowering plant in the family Amaryllidaceae, native to western Colombia and western Ecuador and widely cultivated as an ornamental in other regions.  It is a natural hybrid between E. moorei and  E. sanderi. In horticulture it is often confused with E. amazonica, usually differing in its slightly smaller flowers. The English name Amazon lily is used for both species, but is also used for the genus Eucharis as a whole (and for other genera). Despite the common name, it is not closely related to the true lilies.

In cultivation it requires humidity and temperatures of  when in growth.

References

grandiflora
Plants described in 1854
Garden plants
Flora of Colombia
Flora of Ecuador
Interspecific plant hybrids